The Kvikne Copper Works at Kvikne in Hedmark, Norway were operated from 1630, and were the largest copper works in Norway in the mid-17th century. The ore discovery was reported in 1629. The first mines were called Gabe Gottes and Segen Gottes. Gabe Gottes collapsed in 1677, and in 1682 the copper works suffered severe economic losses as a ship's load of copper was taken by pirates. In 1789 the mines were largely damaged by the flooding disaster Storofsen, and this virtually ended the operation of the mines. During the first 150 years of operation about 6,960 tons of refined copper were produced from the mines at Kvikne.

References

Copper mining companies of Norway
Hedmark
Copper smelters
1630 establishments in Norway